Abdulkadir Özdemir (born 25 March 1991) is a Turkish footballer who plays for as a midfielder for Sarıyer. He made his Süper Lig debut with Trabzonspor on 23 September 2013.

References

External links
 
 

1991 births
Sportspeople from Trabzon
Living people
Turkish footballers
Turkey youth international footballers
Turkey B international footballers
Association football midfielders
1461 Trabzon footballers
Trabzonspor footballers
Şanlıurfaspor footballers
Akhisarspor footballers
Boluspor footballers
Büyükşehir Belediye Erzurumspor footballers
Adanaspor footballers
Vanspor footballers
Ankara Demirspor footballers
Sarıyer S.K. footballers
Süper Lig players
TFF First League players
TFF Second League players